Juliane Banse (born 10 July 1969 in Tettnang, Germany) is a German opera soprano and noted  singer.

Banse received her vocal training at the Zürich Opera, and with Brigitte Fassbaender in Munich. She won first prize in the singing competition of the Kulturforum in Munich in 1989. She made her operatic debut that year as Pamina in Mozart's The Magic Flute at the Komische Oper Berlin. In 1993, the International Franz Schubert Institute, whose jury that year included Elisabeth Schwarzkopf and Dietrich Fischer-Dieskau, awarded her first prize in the International Franz Schubert Competition.

Banse created the role of Schneewittchen in Heinz Holliger's 1998 opera Schneewittchen at the Zürich Opera House. In 2005, she gave the world premiere of J.S. Bach's recently-discovered aria, "Alles mit Gott und nichts ohn' ihn, BWV 1127", with András Schiff and Quatuor Mosaïques. She made her debut at the Metropolitan Opera in New York in 2014 as Zdenka in Richard Strauss' Arabella when she was called to replace the indisposed Genia Kühmeier. In the 2014–2015 season, she sang the role of Fiordiligi in Mozart's Così fan tutte in Barcelona's Gran Teatre del Liceu.

She has been a professor of singing at the Robert Schumann Hochschule since the 2016/17 winter semester.

References

External links 
 
 Biography, career, photos
 

1969 births
Living people
German operatic sopranos
People from Bodenseekreis
20th-century German women  opera singers
21st-century German  women  opera singers
Academic staff of Robert Schumann Hochschule